John Sytek (born March 19, 1943) is an American politician in the state of New Hampshire. He is a member of the New Hampshire House of Representatives, sitting as a Republican from the Rockingham 8 district, having been first elected in 2010. He previously served from 1990 to 1996.

References

Living people
1943 births
Republican Party members of the New Hampshire House of Representatives
Politicians from Philadelphia
People from Salem, New Hampshire
Massachusetts Institute of Technology alumni
20th-century American politicians
21st-century American politicians